LEC was a UK motor racing team and Formula One constructor based at Bognor Regis, West Sussex.

Formula One

1973

In  David Purley hired a March 731 and with backing from his family's refrigeration company LEC Refrigeration, made a largely unsuccessful attempt at Formula One. Purley and the team made their debut in Monaco where the fuel tank broke. Purley did not make the restart at the British GP after he spun off. It was at the 1973 Dutch Grand Prix, however, where Purley carried out arguably his most memorable actions. Upon witnessing a crash which left fellow British driver Roger Williamson trapped in his overturned and burning car, Purley abandoned his own race and attempted to save Williamson, who was participating in only his second Formula One race. Purley later recalled that upon arriving at the scene, he heard Williamson crying for help as the fire began to take hold. Purley's efforts to right the car and extinguish the flames were in vain as he received no help from nearby track marshals or emergency workers, in spite of attempts to encourage them, and other passing drivers, to come to his aid; Williamson died from asphyxiation. Because the marshalls were not wearing fire resistant clothing and the passing drivers believed that Purley was attempting to extinguish his own car, having escaped a fiery crash unharmed; they had no idea that a second driver was involved. The team took their first finish at the German GP. Purley also finished in Italy.

1977

LEC racing returned to Formula One in 1977 with their own LEC chassis designed by Mike Pilbeam and run by Mike Earle. It was this car in which Purley suffered serious injuries in an accident during pre-qualifying for that year's British Grand Prix. He survived an estimated 179.8 g when he decelerated from 173 km/h (108 mph) to 0 in a distance of 66 cm (26 inches) after his throttle got stuck wide open and he hit a wall. For many years, this was thought to be the highest g-force ever survived by a human being. He suffered multiple fractures to his legs, pelvis and ribs.

The second CRP1 has been restored and has competed in historic Formula One racing alongside a modern replica built by WKD Motorsport.

Complete Formula One World Championship results
(key)

References

Formula One constructors
Formula One entrants
British auto racing teams
British racecar constructors